Phelps is an unincorporated community located in the town of Phelps, Vilas County, Wisconsin, United States. Phelps has a post office with ZIP code 54554. The community was established in 1902.

References

Unincorporated communities in Vilas County, Wisconsin
Unincorporated communities in Wisconsin